Okolona is a city in and one of the two county seats of Chickasaw County, Mississippi, United States. It is located near the eastern border of the county. The population was 2,692 at the 2010 census.

History 
Okolona was named as Rose Hill in 1845 early in its settlement, but residents later discovered that another location had this name. When a US post office was established here in 1850, a new name was needed to avoid confusion in mail delivery. According to the Okolona Area Chamber of Commerce, Colonel Josiah N. Walton, postmaster of nearby Aberdeen, Mississippi, remembered an encounter with a Chickasaw warrior years earlier. The man's name was Oka-laua, meaning peaceful, yellow, or blue water. Walton renamed Rose Hill as Okolona in his honor.

Due to the destruction brought to the area by the Civil War, few structures from the antebellum period remain. The Elliott-Donaldson House, constructed in 1850, survives and was added to the National Register of Historic Places in 1980. A few other homes have also survived.

In the mid nineteenth century, Okolona and the surrounding Black Prairie, sometimes called the Black Belt or Prairie Belt, became what has been called the "Bread Basket of the Confederacy". The area was part of the original Cotton Belt of Mississippi well before the more famous Delta region gained fame for major cotton production.

The Mobile and Ohio Railroad completed its tracks though Okolona in 1859, making the town a center for the ginning of cotton and its shipment to markets. The town grew along Main Street as a result of the railroad. Most commercial buildings from this period, including the depot, were burned during the Civil War.

Civil War era
Five skirmishes or battles between Union and Confederate forces occurred in and around Okolona. The eponymous Battle of Okolona occurred in February 1864. In a running cavalry clash between Confederate General Nathan Bedford Forrest and Union General William Sooy Smith, the Federals were defeated just north and west of town. General Forrest's brother, Jeffery, was killed in the engagement.

Okolona College
Okolona College was an historically black college served African Americans 1902–1965. Today it is central to the Okolona College Historic District.

Geography

As highways were built, they passed through the city, connecting it with other towns. This is the location of the junction of former U.S. Route 45 Alternate (Church Street) and Mississippi Highway 32 (Monroe Avenue). US-45A now bypasses the town to the east as a four-lane divided highway.

Demographics

2020 census

As of the 2020 United States Census, there were 2,513 people, 1,164 households, and 645 families residing in the city.

2010 census
As of the 2010 United States Census, there were 2,692 people living in the city. 70.0% were African American, 27.9% White, 0.0% Native American, 0.1% Asian, 0.9% from some other race and 1.1% of two or more races. 1.3% were Hispanic or Latino of any race.

2000 census
As of the census of 2000, there were 3,056 people, 1,177 households, and 786 families living in the city. The population density was 481.8 people per square mile (186.1/km). There were 1,315 housing units at an average density of 207.3 per square mile (80.1/km). The racial makeup of the city was 39.40% White, 59.62% African American, 0.03% Native American, 0.13% Asian, 0.13% from other races, and 0.69% from two or more races. 1.05% of the population were Hispanic or Latino of any race.

There were 1,177 households, out of which 33.8% had children under the age of 18 living with them, 35.6% were married couples living together, 28.1% had a female householder with no husband present, and 33.2% were non-families. 30.2% of all households were made up of individuals, and 14.8% had someone living alone who was 65 years of age or older. The average household size was 2.54 and the average family size was 3.16.

In the city, the population was spread out, with 30.0% under the age of 18, 8.9% from 18 to 24, 24.7% from 25 to 44, 22.0% from 45 to 64, and 14.5% who were 65 years of age or older. The median age was 34 years. For every 100 females, there were 77.2 males. For every 100 females age 18 and over, there were 71.6 males.

The median income for a household in the city was $20,000, and the median income for a family was $32,147. Males had a median income of $26,217 versus $17,276 for females. The per capita income for the city was $11,486. 35.4% of the population and 29.7% of families were below the poverty line. Of the total people living in poverty, 55.4% were under the age of 18 and 20.9% were 65 or older.

Education
Okolona is served by the Okolona Municipal Separate School District. On February 19, 2010, the Mississippi State Board of Education voted unanimously to abolish the school district. State Superintendent of Education Tom Burnham said the conservator of the district will be Mike Vinson.

Notable people
 Thomas Abernethy, former US Congressman
 Tim Bowens, NFL player for the Miami Dolphins for 10 seasons
 Tom Bowens, former professional basketball player
 Frank Burkitt, former member of the Mississippi House of Representatives and the Mississippi State Senate
 DeVan Dallas, Mississippi state legislator
 Meredith Gardner, linguist and codebreaker
 Jack Gordon, former member of the Mississippi House of Representatives and the Mississippi State Senate
 James Gordon, United States Senator
 Jack Gregory, NFL player; member, Mississippi Sports Hall of 
 Russell Jolly, member of the Mississippi State Senate
 William Raspberry, columnist
 Rosa Lee Tucker (1866–1946), Mississippi State Librarian
 Milan Williams, keyboardist and composer for The Commodores

References

External links
 Okolona Chamber of Commerce

Cities in Mississippi
Cities in Chickasaw County, Mississippi
County seats in Mississippi
Mississippi placenames of Native American origin